Torbay is a local government district in Devon, England.

Torbay or Tor Bay can also mean:

Places
 Torbay, Western Australia
 Torbay, Newfoundland and Labrador, Canada
 Torbay, New Zealand
 Tor Bay, Nova Scotia, Canada

People
George Torbay, Australian television personality
Joe Torbay (1941-2009), Canadian puppeteer
Richard Torbay (born 1961), Australian politician
Other
Tor Bay, a bay in Devon, England
Tor Bay (Western Australia), a bay
Tor Bay, a bay in Wales, next to Three Cliffs Bay
 Torbay (UK Parliament constituency)
 Torbay (crater), a crater on Mars
HMS Torbay, the name of several ships of the British Royal Navy